The Rahway Public Schools are a comprehensive community public school district that serves students in pre-kindergarten through twelfth grade from Rahway, in Union County, New Jersey, United States.

As of the 2020–21 school year, the district, comprised of six schools, had an enrollment of 4,056 students and 325.5 classroom teachers (on an FTE basis), for a student–teacher ratio of 12.5:1.

The district is classified by the New Jersey Department of Education as being in District Factor Group "CD", the sixth-highest of eight groupings. District Factor Groups organize districts statewide to allow comparison by common socioeconomic characteristics of the local districts. From lowest socioeconomic status to highest, the categories are A, B, CD, DE, FG, GH, I and J.

Schools
Schools in the district (with 2020–21 enrollment data from the National Center for Education Statistics) are:
Elementary schools
Grover Cleveland Elementary School with 513 students in grades PreK-6
Al Giambrone, Principal
Franklin Elementary School with 618 students in grades PreK-6
Dr. Aleya Shoieb, Principal
Madison Elementary School with 341 students in grades PreK-6
Patricia Volino-Reinoso, Principal
Roosevelt Elementary School with 578 students in grades PreK-6
Marianne Tankard, Principal
Middle school
Rahway 7th & 8th Grade Academy with 730 students in grades 7-8
Wendy Danzy, Principal
High school
Rahway High School with 1,124 students in grades 9-12
Dr. Cary Fields, Principal

Administration
Core members of the district's administration are:
Dr. Tricia Camp, Superintendent
Stephen Fried, Business Administrator / Board Secretary

Board of education
The district's board of education is comprised of nine members who set policy and oversee the fiscal and educational operation of the district through its administration. As a Type II school district, the board's trustees are elected directly by voters to serve three-year terms of office on a staggered basis, with three seats up for election each year held (since 2012) as part of the November general election. The board appoints a superintendent to oversee the district's day-to-day operations and a business administrator to supervise the business functions of the district.

References

External links

Rahway Public Schools
 
School Data for the Rahway Public Schools, National Center for Education Statistics

New Jersey District Factor Group CD
Rahway, New Jersey
School districts in Union County, New Jersey